In 1948, on the initiative of Chilean President Gabriel González Videla, the Chilean National Congress enacted the Permanent Defense of Democracy Law, referred to by many as the Damned Law (Ley Maldita), which outlawed the Communist Party of Chile and banned 26,650 persons from the electoral lists. 

The law banned the expression of ideas which appeared to advocate "the implantation in the republic of a regime opposed to democracy or which attack the sovereignty of the country."  

The detention center in Pisagua, used during Carlos Ibáñez del Campo's dictatorship in the late 1920s (and which would be used again during Pinochet's dictatorship), was re-opened to imprison communists, anarchists and revolutionaries, although on this occasion no detainees were executed. Prominent communists such as the senator Pablo Neruda fled into exile. González Videla also broke relations with the Soviet Union and Warsaw Pact states. A pro-communist miners' strike in Lota was brutally suppressed. Demonstrations against the legislation led to the declaration of martial law and were successfully repressed.

The law was replaced by Law n.º 12.927, about State Security Law (Seguridad del Estado), on 6. August 1958 which ended the proscription of the Communist Party and lowered penalties for crimes against state security and public order to levels comparable with those that existed prior to 1948.

See also
 Communist Party of Chile
 McCarthyism
 Neruda (2016 film)

References

External links
 Memoria Chilena

Anti-communism in Chile
Political repression in Chile
Legal history of Chile
McCarthyism
Political and cultural purges
Political scandals in Chile
Politics of Chile
1948 in Chilean law